Emigrant Bank (formerly Emigrant Savings Bank) is a private American financial institution. It is the oldest savings bank in New York City and it was the ninth-largest privately owned bank in America in 2012, with assets of $8.1 billion. As of June 2021, it has assets of $5.75 billion, and is ranked 244th in asset size among all banks in the United States. Emigrant Bank has several online-only divisions including Emigrant Direct and Dollar Savings Direct.

History
The bank was founded in 1850 by 18 members of the Irish Emigrant Society, with the support of Archbishop John Hughes, purposed of the goal of serving the needs of the Irish community in New York City.  The headquarters was located at 49 Chambers on Chambers Street in Manhattan. Emigrant Savings collected extensive records of the arriving Irish immigrants to America, which were later donated to the New York Public Library and serve as valuable genealogical resources. The Emigrant Savings Bank also had customers from numerous other immigrant communities, including those from Eastern and Northern Europe. 

In 1986, The Emigrant Savings Bank converted from a mutual to a stock savings bank following several years of losses.

The bank increased its online presence with the introduction of the virtual bank Emigrant Direct in 2005.

Owners
The Milstein family owns the bank; Howard Milstein is Chairman, President & Chief Executive Officer of New York Private Bank & Trust, the bank holding company for Emigrant Bank.  In July 2012, the sale of 30 branches to Apple Bank for Savings was announced. Two branches were retained in Manhattan and in Westchester County, New York.

Gallery

References

Banks based in New York City
Banks established in 1850
Privately held companies of the United States